United Nations Security Council Resolution 348, adopted on May 28, 1974, after a report from the Secretary-General, the Council welcomed the determination of Iran and Iraq to de-escalate the situation and improve relations (diplomatic relations were broken off by Iraq in 1971 over disputed Persian Gulf Islands).  The resolution went on to state that both parties had agreed to a strict observance of the March 7 cease-fire agreement, to withdraw concentrations of armed forces along the entire border, the creation of a favorable atmosphere and an early resumption of conversations to settle all bilateral issues.

Resolution 348 was adopted with 14 votes to none; the People's Republic of China did not participate in voting.

See also
 Background to the Iran–Iraq War
 Iran–Iraq relations
 List of United Nations Security Council Resolutions 301 to 400 (1971–1976)

References 
Text of the Resolution at undocs.org

External links
 

 0348
20th century in Iraq
Iran–Iraq relations
 0348
 0348
May 1974 events